William H. Mallory was a storekeeper, farmer, and state legislator in Mississippi. He served in the Mississippi House of Representatives from 1872 to 1873 and from 1876 to 1877 first for Warren County, Mississippi and then for LeFlore County and Sunflower County. Before serving as a state representative he was a policeman and alderman. In 1872 he was elected president of Vicksburg Fire Company #2.

He was born in Virginia. The New National Era newspaper noted his heft.

He had a small general store in Vicksburg during the 1870s.

See also
African-American officeholders during and following the Reconstruction era

References

Members of the Mississippi House of Representatives
American grocers
People from Warren County, Mississippi
African-American politicians during the Reconstruction Era
People from Leflore County, Mississippi
Year of birth missing
Year of death missing
African-American state legislators in Mississippi
African-American police officers
American fire chiefs